John Garland (22 August 1875 – 23 February 1938) was an Australian cricketer. He played one first-class cricket match for Victoria in 1904.

See also
 List of Victoria first-class cricketers

References

External links
 

1875 births
1938 deaths
Australian cricketers
Victoria cricketers
Cricketers from Melbourne